Zinc finger CCCH-type antiviral protein 1 is a protein that in humans is encoded by the ZC3HAV1 gene.

This gene encodes a CCCH-type zinc finger protein that is thought to prevent infection by retroviruses. Studies of the rat homolog indicate that the protein may primarily function to inhibit viral gene expression and induce an innate immunity to viral infection. Alternative splicing occurs at this locus and at least four isoform variants have been described.

References

Further reading